Carlos Cristeto de Dios (born 13 May 1994) is a Spanish professional footballer who plays as a midfielder for SCR Peña Deportiva.

Football career
Born in Salamanca, Castile and León, Cristeto graduated from local UD Salamanca's youth system, making his senior debuts in 2011–12 season, in Segunda División B. In June 2012 he joined RCD Mallorca, being assigned to the reserves also in the third level.

On 29 November Cristeto made his professional debut, playing the last 32 minutes of a 0–0 home draw against Deportivo de La Coruña, for the season's Copa del Rey. On 30 January 2015 he was loaned to UD Poblense, until June.

Cristeto was released by the Bermellones at the end of the 2015–16 season. On 16 July 2016, he signed for CD Atlético Baleares in the third division, after impressing on a trial.
On 3 August 2017 he signed for Panegialios in the Greek second division

References

External links

1994 births
Living people
Sportspeople from Salamanca
Footballers from Castile and León
Spanish footballers
Association football midfielders
Segunda División B players
Tercera División players
UD Salamanca players
RCD Mallorca B players
RCD Mallorca players
UD Poblense players
CD Atlético Baleares footballers
CF Lorca Deportiva players
SCR Peña Deportiva players
Football League (Greece) players
Panegialios F.C. players
Spanish expatriate footballers
Spanish expatriate sportspeople in Greece
Expatriate footballers in Greece